The SV-318 is the basic model of the Spectravideo range. It was fitted with a chiclet style keyboard, difficult to use, alongside which sat a combination cursor pad/joystick. This is a disc-shaped affair with a hole in the centre; put a red plastic 'stick' in the hole and it is a built-in joystick, remove the stick and it is a directional arrow pad for word processing etc. This machine also had only 16 KB of user RAM (plus an additional 16 KB of video RAM), which limited its usefulness, though this could be expanded via an external peripheral box.

This machine is basically identical to its big brother the SV-328, the only differences being in the keyboard and amount of memory. The ROM, expandability, mainboard and case of the two machines were identical.

Reference to the operating system Microsoft Extended BASIC is not to be confused with MSX BASIC, although some marketing at the time claimed that Microsoft Extended is what MSX stood for.  The SV-318 is not fully compliant with the MSX standard.

In 1983, Spectravideo announced the SV-603 ColecoVision Video Game Adapter for the SV-318. The company stated that the $70 product allowed users to "enjoy the entire library of exciting ColecoVision video-game cartridges".

Reception
Popular Mechanics in February 1984 stated that the Spectravideo SV-318 "is worth searching out ... a very nice little machine". The magazine liked the integrated joystick and "stunning" graphics, but advised consumers to consider the small software library before purchasing.

More than 130 games were released for the system.

System specs

 Processor: Zilog Z80A running at 3.58 MHz
 ROM: 32 KB
 BIOS (16 KB)
 BASIC (16 KB)
 RAM: 16 KB
 Video Display Processor: TMS9918
 VRAM: 16 KB
 Text modes: 40×24 and 32×24
 Resolution: 256×192 (16 colours)
 Sprites: 32, 1 colour, max 4 per horizontal line
 Sound chip: General Instrument AY-3-8910 (PSG)
 Programmable Peripheral Interface: Intel 8255

References

External links
SV-318 at Roger's Spectravideo page
El Museo de los 8 Bits

Home computers